Kabani may refer to:

Kabani, Bhamo, Burma
Kabini River
Kabani, Syria, a Syrian village
Kabani (TV series), a 2019-2020 Indian Malayalam series